Syntrophus buswellii is a bacterium. It is a motile, gram-negative, anaerobic rod-shaped organism which catabolises benzoate.

References

Further reading

External links 
LPSN

Type strain of Syntrophus buswellii at BacDive -  the Bacterial Diversity Metadatabase

Thermodesulfobacteriota
Bacteria described in 1984